The Government Gateway is an IT system that was developed to register for online services provided by the UK Government, such as obtaining a driving licence and HMRC self-assessment. This replaced the old system of paper submissions.

The system was set up by the Office of the e-Envoy and allows users to register as either an individual, an organisation or an agent.

It was launched on 25 January 2001, initially being used by services from HM Customs and Excise and for applications through the Ministry of Agriculture, Fisheries and Food for common agricultural policy aid schemes, in addition to Inland Revenue end-of-year transactions.

Services on the Government Gateway were meant to be gradually moved to replacement systems, including GOV.UK Verify. The move was meant to be complete by March 2019.

Following reports of conflict between HMRC and the Government Digital Service (GDS), HMRC has been developing its own service that allows users to sign in using an existing Government Gateway user ID.

HMRC will begin migration from the Government Gateway to the One Login for Government, a new system being developed by GDS.

See also
 Gov.uk

References

E-government in the United Kingdom